Feked is a village in Baranya county, Hungary.

Literature 
Michael Mott (Fulda): Rund um die "Stifoller Woarscht" in Südungarn / Ein Stück "wurstige" Geschichte / Fuldaer Auswanderer des 18. Jahrhunderts brachten Wurstrezept aus ihrer alten Heimat mit / Seit 2010 alljährliches "Stifolder-Festival" (in Feked) mit Prämierung der Bauernwurst, in: Jahrbuch des Landkreises Fulda 2012/2013, 40. Jahrgang, S. 38–49.

External links 
 Street map 

Populated places in Baranya County